Plaza de la República may refer to:

 Plaza de la República (Buenos Aires)
 Plaza de la República Argentina
 Plaza de la República (Mexico City Metrobús, Line 1), a BRT station in Mexico City
 Plaza de la República (Mexico City Metrobús, Line 4), a BRT station in Mexico City

See also
Republic Square (disambiguation)
Náměstí Republiky (disambiguation)
Praça da República (disambiguation)
Piazza della Repubblica (disambiguation)